Artemisia princeps, also called Yomogi, Japanese mugwort, Korean wormwood, Korean mugwort or first wormwood in English, is an Asian plant species in the sunflower family, native to China, Japan and Korea. It is a perennial, very vigorous plant that grows to 1.2 meters. This species spreads rapidly by means of underground stolons and can become invasive. It bears small, buff-colored flowers from July to November which are hermaphroditic, and pollinated by wind. The leaves are feather shaped, scalloped and light green, with white dense fuzz on the underside.

Distribution and habitat 
Artemisia princeps is native to China, Japan and Korea. It has been introduced into Belgium and the Netherlands. It grows in a variety of habitats including roadsides, slopes, valleys, and riverbanks.

Uses

Culinary 
Leaves and young seedlings can be eaten raw or cooked. They can also be used in salads and soups after removal of the bitterness.

Japan 
In Japan the herb is used to flavor glutinous rice dumplings called kusa mochi or yomogi mochi, or rice flour dumplings called kusa dango. The young leaves can be lightly boiled before being pounded and added to which they give a pleasant colour, aroma and flavour. Because of this use, the Artemesia plant is also called mochigusa (though it is also called mogusa in reference to its use in moxibustion). The plant is also actively grown in the state of Hawaii, and used for making the herbal mochi by residents of Japanese descent.

The leaves are occasionally blanched and added to soups or rice in Japanese cuisine.

Korea 
Mugwort, referred to as ssuk (쑥) in Korean, is widely used in Korean cuisine as well as in traditional medicine (hanyak). In spring, which is the harvesting season, the young leaves of mugwort are used to prepare savory dishes such as jeon (Korean-style pancakes), ssuk kimchi, (쑥김치), ssukguk (쑥국, soup made with ssuk). Most commonly, however, fresh mugwort as well as dried leaves ground into powder are a characteristic ingredient in various types of tteok (rice cakes). Today, ssuk also adds flavor and color to more contemporary desserts and beverages, e.g. ice cream, breads, cakes, mugwort tea (ssukcha 쑥차) and ssuk latte (쑥라떼).

Medicinal 
Artemisia princeps is one of the species of mugwort used as in moxibustion, a traditional medical practice of China, Korea, Mongolia, Tibet, Nepal and Vietnam.

China 
In China it is known as huanghua ai (literally yellow-flower mugwort).

Culture 
In Korea, it is called ssuk (쑥) or tarae ssuk (타래쑥) which is deeply related to Dangun Sinhwa (단군신화), legend of Gojoseon, the first Korean kingdom. To the ancient people in Korea, ssuk was one of the foods that was believed to have medicinal or religious value. In the foundation myth of Gojoseon in 2333 BCE, eating nothing but 20 cloves of garlic and a bundle of ssuk for 100 days let a bear be transformed into a woman.

See also
Kampo herb list

References

External links
 

princeps
Medicinal plants of Asia
Korean vegetables
Plants described in 1930
Flora of China
Flora of Eastern Asia